"There's a Ghost in My House" is a song written by Brian Holland, Lamont Dozier, and Eddie Holland of Motown Records, together with R. Dean Taylor.  It was originally recorded by Taylor in 1966, and it reached No. 3 in 1974 in the UK.

Background
"There's a Ghost in My House" was produced by Brian Holland and Lamont Dozier. It was released as a single on the Motown subsidiary V.I.P. label in April 1967, but was not a hit.  However, after it had become a popular dance song in Northern soul clubs in Britain, such as the Blackpool Mecca and Wigan Casino, R. Dean Taylor's record was reissued on EMI's Tamla Motown label with a B-side of "Let's Go Somewhere", and reached No. 3 on the UK Singles Chart in 1974.

Covers

Versions were later recorded by British bands Yachts (1980), B.E.F. (British Electric Foundation) featuring Paul Jones (1982), and the Very Things (1987). A version recorded by the Fall in 1987 became their first single to reach the top 50 in the UK, peaking at No. 30, and was included on their album The Frenz Experiment. Graham Parker recorded a version released in 2000 on Loose Monkeys: Spare Tracks and Lost Demos.

Charts

R. Dean Taylor

References

Songs about ghosts
1967 singles
1974 singles
Songs written by Holland–Dozier–Holland
Songs written by R. Dean Taylor
Motown singles
1966 songs
Song recordings produced by Brian Holland
Song recordings produced by Lamont Dozier
Northern soul songs
The Fall (band) songs